DD Saptagiri previously known as DD-8 (Telugu: దూరదర్శన్ సప్తగిరి)  is a state-owned television channel telecasting in the Telugu language from a studio at Doordarshan Kendra Vijayawada, Andhra Pradesh, India. The studio was inaugurated by the Chief Minister of Andhra Pradesh, Shri N. Chandrababu Naidu, on 27 September 2014. 

In addition to terrestrial over-the-air transmission, the DD Vijayawada studio programmes are beamed through direct-broadcast satellite (DTH) and cable networks. Doordarshan Kendra  Vijayawada’s Regional Network in Telugu took on a new identity as "DD Saptagiri", on 27 September 2014. This service is viewed in India and some other parts of the world. The channel is named after the seven hills surrounding the Tirumala Venkateswara Temple in Tirupati at the south of the state ('Sapta' in Sanskrit means seven and 'Giri' means mountain or hill).

Popularity
Doordarshan Vijayawada was the only television channel broadcast from Andhra Pradesh after bifurcation of the state. Its programmes are aimed mainly at 13 districts of Andhra Pradesh. Since the '90s, DD Vijayawada has been a small studio facility through which programmes based on coastal Andhra are produced and used to be aired weekly once through DDK Hyderabad. It was launched by Andhra Pradesh CM Nara Chandhra Babu Naidu and Union Minister of Urban Development Shri Venkaiah Naidu on 27 September 2014. Venkaiah Naidu announced that the All India Radio Bhavan here was named Pingali Venkaiah Bhavan.

Frequency and satellite details from DD Free Dish
INSAT-4B (C-BAND)93.5E 4060 MHZ Horizontal, symbol rate- 4250, 
INSAT-4B (KU) 93.5E  11150 V 27500

Channel details from APSFL
Channel 064 on APSFL

See also
 All India Radio 
 DD Direct Plus 
 Ministry of Information and Broadcasting 
 List of programs broadcast by DD National 
 List of South Asian television channels by country

References

External links 
 
 Doordarshan Official Internet site 
 Doordarshan news site 

Telugu-language television channels
Foreign television channels broadcasting in the United Kingdom
Television channels and stations established in 1977
Direct broadcast satellite services
Indian direct broadcast satellite services
Doordarshan
Television stations in Andhra Pradesh
Television stations in Vijayawada